Dennis Smith may refer to:

Sports
 Dennis Smith (American football) (born 1959), American football player
 Dennis Smith (Australian footballer) (1939–2017), Australian footballer for Richmond
 Dennis Smith (ice hockey) (born 1964), American ice hockey defenseman
 Dennis Smith (New Zealand cricketer) (1913–1986), New Zealand fast bowler
 Dennis Smith (New Zealand footballer), New Zealand international footballer
 Dennis Smith (South African cricketer) (born 1971), South African cricketer and umpire
 Dennis Smith Jr. (born 1997), American basketball player

Other
 Dennis Smith (darts player) (born 1969), English darts player
 Dennis Smith (director), American television director
 Dennis Smith (firefighter) (1940-2022), American firefighter and writer
 Dennis Smith (politician), Minnesota politician
 Dennis Smith (sculptor) (born 1942), American sculptor
 Dennis G. Smith, American government official
 L. Dennis Smith, American developmental biologist

See also 
Denny Smith (born 1938), U.S. Representative from Oregon
Denny Smith (singer), American singer
Denis Smith (disambiguation)